John Munch is a fictional character played by actor Richard Belzer. Munch first appeared on the American crime drama television series Homicide: Life on the Street on NBC. A regular through the entire run of the series from 1993 to 1999, Munch is a cynical detective in the Baltimore Police Department's Homicide unit, and a firm believer in conspiracy theories. He is originally partnered with Detective Stanley Bolander (Ned Beatty). Munch is based on Jay Landsman, a central figure in David Simon's 1991 true crime book Homicide: A Year on the Killing Streets.

Upon the cancellation of Homicide in 1999, Belzer was offered a regular role as Munch on the Law & Order spin-off titled Special Victims Unit. He appeared in the first fifteen seasons of that series from 1999 to 2014, and occasionally as a guest thereafter. On SVU, Munch becomes a senior detective in the New York Police Department's Special Victims Unit, and is first partnered with Brian Cassidy (Dean Winters), followed by Monique Jeffries (Michelle Hurd), and Fin Tutuola (Ice-T). In the ninth season premiere, Munch is promoted to the rank of sergeant and occasionally takes on supervisory functions within the department. In season 14, Munch is temporarily reassigned to the Cold Case Unit, after solving a decade-old child abduction case in the episode "Manhattan Vigil". He returns to the squad in "Secrets Exhumed", in which he brings back a 1980s rape-homicide cold case for the squad to investigate. In the season 15 episode, "Internal Affairs", SVU Captain Donald Cragen (Dann Florek) informs Detective Olivia Benson (Mariska Hargitay) that Munch has submitted his retirement papers, stating that a recent case (portrayed in the episode "American Tragedy") had "hit him hard". In the following episode, "Wonderland Story", Cragen and the squad throw Munch a retirement party, where past and present colleagues and family members celebrate his career. At the conclusion of the episode, Munch returns to the precinct to gather his belongings, where he and Cragen shake hands as Cragen remarks, "you had one hell of a run, Sergeant Munch." Munch has returned, post-retirement, to help his colleagues in the fifteenth-season finale "Spring Awakening" and the seventeenth-season episode "Fashionable Crimes".

The character of Munch has appeared in a total of ten series on five networks since the character's debut in 1993. Apart from Homicide and SVU, however, Belzer's performances as Munch were guest appearances or crossovers rather than regular or recurring appearances. With Munch's retirement in the character's 22nd season on television, he was a regular character on U.S. television longer than Marshal Matt Dillon (Gunsmoke) and Frasier Crane (Cheers and Frasier), both of whom were on television for 20 seasons; he is only behind Mariska Hargitay's character Olivia Benson.  Munch's return to help his friends in the SVU seventeenth-season episode "Fashionable Crimes" marks the 23rd season that the character has appeared on television in any capacity. Belzer died on February 19, 2023 after retiring from acting in 2016 and living out his final years in Bozouls, France.

Character progression 
Munch first appeared as a central character in the TV series Homicide: Life on the Street, as a homicide detective in the Baltimore Police Department's fictionalized homicide unit, which debuted January 31, 1993. The character was primarily based on Jay Landsman, a central figure in David Simon's 1991 true crime book Homicide: A Year on the Killing Streets, a documentary account of the homicide unit's operation over one year. However, Munch's storyline also touched on the book's depiction of the relationship between real-life detectives Donald Worden and David Brown, in which Worden was relentless in his tutelage/hazing of the younger detective but also genuinely wanted him to succeed and was impressed when the younger cop did excellent work. A storyline in the book involving Brown's cracking a very difficult hit-and-run homicide was included almost verbatim in the show's pilot.

Barry Levinson, co-creator and executive producer of Homicide, said Belzer was a "lousy actor" during his audition when he first read lines from the script for "Gone for Goode", the first episode in the series. Levinson asked Belzer to take some time to reread and practice the material, then come back and read it again. During his second reading, Levinson said Belzer was "still terrible", but that the actor eventually found confidence in his performance.

Munch appeared as a regular character in every season, and in almost every episode, of Homicide. After Homicide: Life on the Street concluded its seventh season in May 1999, the character transferred into the Law & Order universe as a regular character on Law & Order: Special Victims Unit (both Homicide and the original Law & Order had crossed-over numerous times before, and Munch had featured centrally in each crossover). It is explained that Munch had retired from the Baltimore Police Department, taken his pension as a Maryland state employee, and moved to New York to join a sex crimes investigation unit, where he was eventually given a promotion to sergeant.

Munch joined the BPD's homicide unit in 1983.  During the fourth-season premiere of Homicide: Life on the Street, he signs up to take a promotion exam in hopes of becoming a sergeant, but a "comedy of errors" prevents him from showing up for it. In the first episode of the ninth season of Law & Order: Special Victims Unit, it is revealed that he passed the NYPD sergeant's exam, having taken it on a bar bet, and earned his promotion. He is temporarily promoted to commanding officer of the Special Victims Unit following Cragen's temporary reassignment, but is depicted as happily relinquishing control back to him, commenting upon Cragen's return, "This job sucks." He kept his rank, however, as he is still referred to as Sergeant in later episodes. He is temporarily put in charge again when Cragen is suspended after the detectives mishandle a case.

Munch makes a cameo appearance on a fifth-season episode of The Wire. Munch can be seen at Kavanaugh's Bar arguing with the bartender over his tab by referencing his experience running a bar (he opened The Waterfront Bar in Homicide). He appears in "Unusual Suspects", the third episode of the fifth season of The X-Files—the episode is set in 1989, when Munch was still at the Baltimore Police Department.

Character biography
Though his age is never directly stated on Homicide, a few clues are presented pointing to it. In the episode "Kaddish", Munch talks about his high school years and looks at a yearbook from 1961. In the episode "Full Court Press", Munch says: "Going to high school was no day at the beach for a teenage Jew in the '50s". Because first grade began at age six and high school ended in 12th grade in Maryland during this time, it is likely Munch was born in 1944, the same year as Belzer. Munch is described, however, as being 48 years old in the 2000 SVU episode "Chat Room". Assuming the episode took place at the time it premiered, he would have most likely been born in 1951. Also noteworthy is a seventh season episode of Homicide in which the ongoing conflict between Munch and Det. Stuart Gharty (Peter Gerety) culminates. After a confrontation inside the Waterfront bar, Gharty asks Munch how old he was in 1970, during the Vietnam War, to which Munch responds "Eighteen", putting the year of his birth circa 1951.

SVU and Homicide have Munch growing up in different places. In Homicide, he is a native of Maryland and attended high school in Pikesville, which has a large Jewish community. Munch said that he took many field trips to Fort McHenry as a child, which would likely only happen were he to live in the area. In SVU, however, Munch tells Det. Olivia Benson (Mariska Hargitay) that he grew up on the "Lower East Side". Munch also tells Det. Fin Tutuola (Ice-T) that he "came back from Baltimore" after his fourth marriage broke up. In Homicide, he says he attended Pikesville High School for four years. His grandfather worked in the garment business. Munch worked with him in the early 1960s.

Munch's childhood was not a happy one. He and his brothers Bernie and David were physically abused by their father, who had bipolar disorder. One night after getting a beating "for being a wiseass", Munch told his father he hated his guts. That was the last thing he ever said to his father before his father committed suicide; for years afterward, he believed his father's death was his fault. Munch has a paternal uncle named Andrew (Jerry Lewis) who suffers from depressive pseudodementia. Andrew is found by Elliot Stabler (Christopher Meloni) living as a transient in Manhattan, and is subsequently reunited with his nephew. Andrew, however, reacts badly to his antidepressant medication, which triggers a mania that results in his taking a personal vendetta against a suspected rapist/murderer SVU is investigating, eventually killing the man by pushing him in front of a subway train. Andrew refuses to plead insanity and take further medication, and says goodbye to his nephew one last time before being sent to prison. In a deleted scene from the third season of Homicide, Munch mentions to both Meldrick Lewis (Clark Johnson) and Tim Bayliss (Kyle Secor) that he had an uncle who lived up north but was unsure of what became of him – this is presumably Andrew. Munch is affected by the death of a young girl who lived near him when he was a teenager; he feels guilty for not noticing that she was being abused by her mother, who eventually killed her, despite seeing the girl every day when he came home from school. In the 14th-season SVU episode "Twenty-Five Acts", it is mentioned that Munch's mother is living in a retirement community.

During the late 1960s and the early 1970s, he was an occasional reporter and music reviewer for the alternative magazine The Paper. Although he considered himself to be a "dangerous radical" due to his left-wing views, conspiracy theories and involvement with anti-Vietnam War protests, the FBI believed that he was a dilettante and posed no threat.

Munch's partner at the start of Homicide is Stanley Bolander (Ned Beatty), an experienced police detective with more than 20 years under his belt. The two are partners through the show's first three seasons until Bolander is first suspended and then retires. Despite the tremendous amount of grief the two give each other, Munch respects him and counts him as a dear friend.

In SVU, Munch is first partnered with Brian Cassidy (Dean Winters), whom he treats as a surrogate younger brother, alternately poking fun at him and imparting questionable advice on life and women. When Cassidy leaves the precinct in 2000, Munch is briefly partnered with Monique Jeffries (Michelle Hurd). However, after she is forced to leave precinct he is paired with her replacement, Odafin Tutuola (Ice-T). He and Fin get off to a rough start, but eventually grow to like and respect each other. After Munch is shot by a Neo-Nazi during a trial, the dialogue he shares with Fin in the hospital demonstrates the warm regard the characters have for each other. When Fin gets frustrated over a potential witness being unable to testify due to relapsing on heroin, Munch mentions a former partner - likely Steve Crosetti - who took cases like that personally and eventually committed suicide as a result.

In Homicide, along with Tim Bayliss (Kyle Secor) and Meldrick Lewis (Clark Johnson), Munch is co-owner of "The Waterfront", a bar located across the street from their Baltimore police station. This is referenced in season 5 of The Wire, in episode 7, titled "Took".  Munch is speaking to a bartender at Kavanaugh's as journalist Augustus Haynes (Clark Johnson) walks in. The camera pans by him as he says the lines, "Rodney, you can't press a regular for his whole tab. It just isn't done. I used to run a bar, I know how these things work, remember?"

Even during the severe recession of the late 2000s, Munch talks about wanting to buy a bar again in New York.

In SVU, Munch takes the Sergeant's exam on a bar bet, passes, and is promoted to that rank.  As sergeant, he is called upon to take charge of the unit on a number of occasions when Cragen is relieved of duty. Following the events of the season 15 episode "Internal Affairs", Cragen informs Benson that Munch has submitted his retirement papers. Munch officially retires in the episode "Wonderland Story", with the squad throwing a party for him. Cragen announces that Munch will become a special investigator in the District Attorney's office and Fin presents him with a going-away gift from the squad, a shadow box containing all the badges he carried as a police officer in both Baltimore and New York. As the episode concludes, Munch is at his desk in the squad room, packing his personal items into a box. He has a brief flashback to "Gone for Goode", the Homicide series premiere, in which he sat at his desk to go through a pile of mug shots. The phone rings, and he answers it "Homicide, I mean SVU"; he then puts the caller on hold and leaves with his box.

Munch later returns to SVU to help Amaro being released from prison and offer some advice after he's arrested for assaulting a pedophile.

Munch returns for the final time to help out SVU investigate a photographer who has raped a young model and so many others for the past twelve years. Once the case is close, he later babysat Benson's son, Noah. Before he left, Munch and Benson have remarked that there are so many things in life that are more important than SVU and part on good terms. Subsequently, Munch married a rabbi and moved back to Baltimore, retaking ownership of the Waterfront.

List of assignments
 Detective, Baltimore PD Homicide (1983–May 5, 1995)
 Senior Detective, Baltimore PD Homicide (October 20, 1995 – May 21, 1999)
 Senior Detective, NYPD 16th Precinct (Special Victims Unit) (September 20, 1999 – May 22, 2007)
 Sergeant–Detective Squad, NYPD 16th Precinct (Special Victims Unit) (September 25, 2007 – October 16, 2013)
 Special Investigator, New York County District Attorney's Office (October 16, 2013–Present)

Temporary assignments
 Acting Commanding Officer, NYPD 16th Precinct (Special Victims Unit) (September 25, 2007)
 Acting Commanding Officer, NYPD 16th Precinct (Special Victims Unit) (November 11, 2009)
 Sergeant–Detective Squad, NYPD Cold Case Squad (October 31, 2012 – February 13, 2013)

Ranks
 Officer
 Detective (Baltimore PD)
 Detective 1st Grade (NYPD)
  Sergeant
 District Attorney Special Investigator (New York County DA)

Partners
Homicide: Life on the Street:
 Detective Stanley Bolander (Ned Beatty) (January 31, 1993 – May 5, 1995)
 Detective Megan Russert (Isabella Hofmann) (January 5, 1996 – May 17, 1996)
 Detective Mike Kellerman (Reed Diamond)
 Detective Tim Bayliss (Kyle Secor)
Law & Order: SVU:
 Detective 3rd Grade Ken Briscoe (Chris Orbach)
 Detective 3rd Grade Brian Cassidy (Dean Winters) (September 20, 1999 – February 4, 2000)
 Detective 3rd Grade Monique Jeffries (Michelle Hurd) (February 11, 2000 – October 20, 2000)
 Detective 2nd/1st Grade Odafin "Fin" Tutuola (Ice-T) (October 20, 2000 – May 22, 2007)

Awards and decorations
The following are the medals and service awards worn by NYPD Detective Munch, as seen in "Alternate".

Characteristics 
Munch is Jewish but said the only thing he and Judaism had in common was that he "didn't like to work on Saturdays." He indicates that he is familiar with Jewish prayers, and eventually says Kaddish at the end of an episode of Homicide of the same name in memory of a Jewish murder victim. He is familiar with common Yiddish words and phrases. Munch interacts with an Orthodox Jewish witness, using one Yiddish word, farshteyn ("understand"), and referring to the twelve Israelite tribes from the Bible. The man remarks that Munch must be Jewish and consequently agrees to help him out of a fraternal connection. After the interaction, Munch reciprocates by offering the man a ride back to the Riverdale neighborhood in The Bronx.  He identifies his ethnic background as Romanian.

He has a younger brother named Bernie who owns a funeral parlor; he once joked that he occasionally "throws him some business". He mentioned another brother who is in the drywall business.  His brother David attended his farewell roast. His cousin Lee acts as his accountant—and the accountant for The Waterfront—when he lives in Baltimore.

Munch has been described as a stubborn man who distrusts all women, all forms of government and authority, and "can smell a conspiracy at a five-year-old's lemonade stand".  Munch can often be seen lecturing his co-workers on a variety of conspiracy theories, which he views as obvious truths. In the SVU pilot episode, he rants about a supposed government cover-up in the assassination of John F. Kennedy.  However, Munch does not seem to believe all conspiracy theories; in The X-Files episode "Unusual Suspects"—a cross-over episode with Homicide—Munch dismisses the Lone Gunmen's claims of a government plot to expose Baltimore residents to a hallucinogenic gas.

At the onset of Homicide, he had been divorced twice and was dating a woman named Felicia. By the seventh season, he had a total of three ex-wives until marrying Waterfront bartender Billie Lou Hatfield (Ellen McElduff). Before leaving Baltimore, Munch had divorced Billie Lou after discovering she had been having an affair with a member of his own precinct after less than one day of marriage. In the season 1 finale of SVU, a police psychiatrist notes that despite his cynicism regarding relationships, Munch still believes in true love and is devastated by the fact he has not yet found it.

He once stated that he and his first wife Gwen had sex once after their divorce. Her first on-screen appearance is the Homicide episode "All Is Bright", in which she is played by Carol Kane. Gwen shows up at The Waterfront to inform Munch her mother has died. As the two catch up, he agrees to arrange for the funeral of Gwen's mother despite the fact his ex-mother-in-law loathed him and did everything in her power to disrupt her daughter's marriage to him. Near the end of the episode, Munch performs a touching toast to his former mother-in-law in one of the few times his cynical façade slips. Kane next returns as Gwen in "Zebras",
the season 10 finale of SVU, and is portrayed as suffering from paranoid schizophrenia. While working with Lennie Briscoe (Jerry Orbach) in the season four episode of Homicide, "For God and Country", a crossover with Law & Order, Munch loses badly to Briscoe in a pool game and learns Briscoe had briefly dated and slept with Gwen. Distraught, he gets drunk and proclaims that he forgives Gwen and still loves her.  Despite this, he and Briscoe become quite good friends—their interaction in the two following crossovers between Homicide and Law & Order, as well as in a crossover between Law & Order and SVU, is generally friendly (Belzer originally pitched to Dick Wolf that Munch join Law & Order as Briscoe's new partner, but the role had already been filled by Ed Green, played by Jesse L. Martin).

While Munch could never be accused of being sentimental, his cynical façade has occasionally slipped, revealing a deep compassion for children born from his unhappy childhood. When Munch emerges unscathed from an ambush shooting during a third-season episode of Homicide that leaves three of his colleagues hospitalized, he tries to laugh it off but breaks down in tears.  In the second season of SVU, after solving a case dealing with an abusive mother who put her daughter in a coma, Munch tells Benson that when he was in high school, one of his neighbors killed her daughter and for years afterward he felt guilty for failing to recognize the girl needed help.

Munch is a staunch believer in individual rights and occasionally finds that something he has to do in the line of duty goes against his sense of morality. A particularly disturbing experience for him was having to see patients on dialysis have their kidney transplants denied.

In a third-season episode of Homicide, Munch is suspected by Detective Tim Bayliss of having murdered Gordon Pratt (Steve Buscemi), the suspect in the shooting of three homicide detectives, including Munch's partner Stanley Bolander.  Munch had motive, opportunity, an unconfirmed alibi, and never actually denies killing Pratt, but Bayliss refuses to question Munch further or test his service weapon to determine if it has been fired recently.  He closes the case, informing his shift commander there was insufficient evidence to charge anyone.

Munch is fluent in French.  He also has some conversational ability in Russian, Hebrew, Yiddish, Spanish, Greek, and Hungarian.

Diminished role 
A 2007 news item noted the character of Munch "has slowly disappeared from [SVUs] plotlines", and quotes Belzer as saying "[i]t's mystifying to me", admitting his feelings to be "slightly hurt". Following season nine, in which Munch appeared in just over half of the episodes, Belzer reiterated his mystification at the development but also seemed to want to tone it down: "It's like yanking the tonsils out of the gift horse if I complain too much. I've been lucky over the years...c'est la vie, I'm not starving."

Continuity 
Although Homicide: Life on the Street and Law & Order: SVU officially share the same continuity, they provide conflicting accounts of Munch's childhood and SVU rarely mentions Munch's past as a Baltimore homicide detective.  Four regular actors from Homicide (Peter Gerety, Callie Thorne, Michael Michele, Andre Braugher) and two recurring ones (Clayton LeBouef, Željko Ivanek), whose characters regularly interacted with Munch on that series have appeared as different, unrelated characters on SVU, sometimes sharing scenes with Munch. In Braugher's first appearance on SVU as Attorney Bayard Ellis, there is an implicit nod towards the shared continuity between the shows when Munch greets Braugher's character as if he knows him. "There's a glimmer of [recognition]," as Braugher described the meeting.

There were three specific examples of consistent continuity between the two shows, all related to Munch's personal life. One is Munch's amicable divorce from Gwen, who has appeared in episodes of both Homicide and SVU. Homicide: The Movie features Munch's temporary return to assist the Baltimore Homicide Unit when his friend and former boss – BPD Lieutenant Al Giardello – has been shot, with dialogue acknowledging that Munch is currently assigned to Manhattan's Special Victims Unit. The two shows come together for Munch's retirement when his SVU party is attended by Homicide BPD Detective Meldrick Lewis (Clark Johnson) and his first and fourth ex-wives, Gwen and Billie Lou, who were both introduced as characters on Homicide.

Credits
From 1993 to 1997, Belzer has been credited as portraying Detective John Munch in all 122 episodes of Homicide: Life on the Street (appearing in 119 episodes), as well as the 2000 follow up television film Homicide: The Movie.

Belzer continued to portray Munch on Law & Order: Special Victims Unit from 1999 to 2017, being credited in 325 episodes (appearing in 242 episodes). 

Additionally, within the larger Law & Order universe, Belzer has been credited for appearing as Munch in five other episodes—four episodes in the original Law & Order series, appearances spanning from 1996 to 2000, and one episode of the short-lived spinoff series, Law & Order: Trial by Jury in 2005.

Appearances and crossovers
The character has spanned over 20 years and 23 seasons of network television. Along with his main cast roles on Homicide and SVU, Munch has also appeared as a character in other TV series, movies, talk shows, albums and comic books:

 Homicide: Life on the Street—119 out of 122 episodes in the series
 Law & Order: Special Victims Unit—242 out of 325 episodes in the series
 Homicide: The Movie—television movie
 Law & Order—four episodes: "Charm City", "Baby, It's You" (part 1),  "Sideshow (Part 1)", and "Entitled (Part 2)"
 Arrested Development—one episode: "Exit Strategy"
 The X-Files—one episode: "Unusual Suspects"
 The Beat—one episode: "They Say It's Your Birthday"
 Law & Order: Trial by Jury—one episode: "Skeleton (Part 2)"
 The Wire—one episode: "Took"
 American Dad—one episode: "Next of Pin", Detective Munch shows up at the end of the episode to recruit Steve to join him as a detective after being impressed by Steve's detective work at the bowling alley.
 30 Rock—two episodes: "¡Qué Sorpresa!", the characters are watching an SVU episode, with dialogue written and action shot specifically for 30 Rock.  Richard Belzer also appears as the actor playing Munch in "Last Lunch", part one of 30 Rocks series finale, when Jenna Maroney (Jane Krakowski) lands a guest role on SVU as a corpse.
 Jimmy Kimmel Live!—one episode: October 7, 2009. Richard Belzer was interviewed as himself, then does an impromptu scene as Munch with Kimmel and Joel McHale.
 Unbreakable Kimmy Schmidt—one episode: "Kimmy Goes to the Doctor!", the characters are watching a fictional Law & Order spinoff episode on their television.
 A Muppet version of Munch appeared in the Sesame Street sketch "Law & Order: Special Letters Unit" where he was portrayed by David Rudman.
 Munch makes a cameo appearance on the 1993 Paul Shaffer album The World's Most Dangerous Party.
 An artwork version of Munch appears in the 2016 comic book Spider-Man/Deadpool #6.
 An unseen Munch is mentioned, by Detective Chief Inspector John Luther, as an NYPD SVU contact on episode 5 of the UK crime drama Luther. Notably, DCI Luther is played by Idris Elba, who played Stringer Bell in the HBO drama The Wire, where Munch previously cameoed.
 On a 2021 episode of the podcast Quality Time, Munch is portrayed in an improvised scene from Homicide by the episode's guest, Tom Myers.

Munch has become the only fictional character, played by a single actor, to physically appear on 10 different television series. These shows were on five different networks: NBC (Homicide: Life on the Street, Law & Order, Law & Order: Special Victims Unit, Law & Order: Trial by Jury, and 30 Rock), Fox (The X-Files and Arrested Development), UPN (The Beat), HBO (The Wire) and ABC (Jimmy Kimmel Live!). Munch has been one of the few television characters to cross genres, appearing not only in crime drama series, but sitcom (Arrested Development), adult animated sitcom (American Dad), late night comedy (Jimmy Kimmel Live!) and horror and science fiction (The X-Files).

See also
 Fictional crossover
 Tommy Westphall

References

External links
Detective John Munch at the Internet Movie Database.

Fictional American Jews
Fictional Baltimore Police Department detectives
Fictional New York City Police Department detectives
Fictional characters based on real people
Fictional characters from Baltimore
Television characters introduced in 1993
Crossover characters in television
Fictional New York City Police Department sergeants
Homicide: Life on the Street characters
Law & Order: Special Victims Unit characters
American male characters in television
The X-Files characters
American sitcom television characters
Arrested Development
The Wire characters